Saray (also, Sarai) is a village and the most populous municipality, except for the capital Xırdalan, in the Absheron Rayon of Azerbaijan. It has a population of 10,693.

Notable natives 

 Mikhail Alakbarov — Hero of the Soviet Union.
 Vali Akhundov — First Secretary of the Communist Party of Azerbaijan SSR (1959–1969).
 Nariman Mamedov - Who is founder of the new settlement of Saray, who moved it from old to a new location (1955).

References 

Populated places in Absheron District